James Byrne, also known as "Jemmy" or "Jaws" is an Irish criminal. He was once an associate of Martin Cahill.

Family
He is married to Sadie Roe and is the father of six children, including Liam Byrne and David Byrne. His son David was shot dead in February 2016.

Criminal history
He has a history of fraud and counterfeiting.

In November 2002 he agreed to repay €43,353 in unemployment assistant that he was not entitled to. 
He paid the Revenue Commissioners €208,400 after Revenue and the Criminal Assets Bureau issued him and his wife with a tax assessment of €378,612 in 2004. Some of the assessment was paid from €22,000 in cash seized at his home in 2001.

References

Irish male criminals
21st-century Irish criminals
Living people
Year of birth missing (living people)